Shadow Star, known in Japan as , is a manga and anime created by Mohiro Kitoh. The 13-episode anime adaptation was broadcast in 2003 on the Japanese television station Kids Station. The anime was licensed by Central Park Media and released as Shadow Star Narutaru, and has played on Comcast's Anime Selects multiple times. In 2007 it ran on the Illusion on Demand television network. Central Park Media released the title under their "U.S. Manga Corps" line, on 4 DVDs, and later re-released the DVDs in a box set. Central Park Media filed for bankruptcy in 2009, and the DVDs have since been out of print.

Episodes

References 

Shadow Star Narutaru